Claire Vaughn Labine (née Wood; June 28, 1934 – November 11, 2016) was an American soap opera writer and producer.

1990s

In 1993, Labine returned to daytime as head writer of ABC's General Hospital. She brought the show much critical acclaim, and won her seventh Daytime Emmy for Outstanding Writing for her work on the show. She chose to depart the show in early 1996. During this time, she created a proposed General Hospital spin-off, Heart and Soul, about two families, one black, one white, both show business families. The black family was three generations of jazz musicians. Next door was a theatrical family. The show was not picked up by ABC or NBC; Wendy Riche's competing Port Charles was ABC's choice instead.

Labine co-wrote, with Judith Pinsker, the 1995 New York Times bestseller General Hospital tie-in novel Robin's Diary, based in the AIDS storyline between characters Stone Cates and Robin Scorpio.

In 1996, Labine was offered the head writer role at As the World Turns but turned it down because she and her son Matthew Labine were trying to get HEART & SOUL [aka Union Place] on the air. "I had to turn it down because we were in the middle of that development.  I said to Procter & Gamble, 'I am gratified by this offer, but if I have any chance at all...'  I didn't think there was much chance but I thought it was worth a go to do our own show. And they were very lovely about it."

In late 1996, she was made head writer of ABC's One Life to Live because she had a year and a half left on her contract with ABC. She remained with the show until early 1998.

2000s
Most recently, Labine had a short stint at CBS' Guiding Light. She was head writer of the show from 2000 through 2001. Labine shared the reins of GL with her children, Matthew Labine and Eleanor Labine. Rumors abounded throughout Labine's tenure at GL that she, Executive Producer Paul Rauch, and Executive in Charge of Production Mary Alice Dwyer-Dobbin had frequent arguments about the show's direction.

At one point, it was announced in the soap press that the Labines were departing, only to have the announcement recanted a week later.  P&G did eventually replace the Labines the following year with writers Lloyd Gold and Christopher Dunn.

In November 2009, Labine gave WeLoveSoaps.net an exclusive interview during which she discussed her struggles with ABC during Ryan's Hope, her enjoyment of writing General Hospital, and her less enjoyable experiences on One Life to Live and Guiding Light. She discussed details about her aborted project, Union Place, and insights into her illustrious career.

Death
Labine died on November 11, 2016 at her home in Somers, Connecticut at the age of 82 from undisclosed causes.

Positions held
Captain Kangaroo
Script writer: 1966-1967

Where the Heart Is
Co-head writer: 1971–1973
Script writer: 1970–1971

Love of Life
Co-head writer 1973–1975

Ryan's Hope
Co-Creator
Executive Producer: July 1975 – June 1982
Head writer: July 1975 – June 1982, January 1983 – November 1983, February 1987 – January 1989

General Hospital
Head writer: October 1993 – March 1996

One Life to Live
Head writer: December 1996 – April 1998

Guiding Light
Head writer: August 2000 – July 2001

Awards

Daytime Emmy
9 Wins 
(1995; Outstanding Writing; General Hospital)
(1977, 1978, 1979, 1980, 1983 & 1984, Outstanding Writing, Ryan's Hope)
(1977, 1979 Outstanding Drama Series, Ryan's Hope)

12 nominations
(1978, 1981 & 1982, Outstanding Drama Series, Ryan's Hope)

National Academy Of New York Arts And Sciences
Silver Circle Recipient
2000

Writers Guild Of America
Wins
1995, General Hospital
1994, General Hospital
1980-1983, 1986–1989, Ryan's Hope

Nominations
2001, Guiding Light
1996, General Hospital
1979, Ryan's Hope

Other
Honored with Evelyn F. Burkey Award by the Writers Guild of America on February 19, 2005. The award was presented to her by friend and former Ryan's Hope star Kate Mulgrew.
Connecticut College Gold Medal 1995 Inherit The Earth Award for General Hospital story line on environmental racism, a ground-breaking plot for daytime about a trash incinerator about to be located in a low income area featured icon Laura Webber in fight for social justice .
Labine served the Writers Guild of America, East, as vice president for three terms, and is a recipient of the Richard Jablow Award for devoted service to the Guild.
She has been given Lifetime Achievement Awards by the New York Chapter of National Academy of Television Arts & Sciences and Soap Opera Digest.

Head writer tenure

References

1934 births
2016 deaths
American soap opera writers
Soap opera producers
Columbia University School of the Arts alumni
University of Kentucky alumni
American women television producers
Daytime Emmy Award winners
Writers Guild of America Award winners
American women television writers
American women screenwriters
Women soap opera writers
People from Somers, Connecticut
Kentucky women writers
Screenwriters from Connecticut
Screenwriters from Kentucky
Television producers from Connecticut
21st-century American women